Klimkin (masculine) or Klimkina (feminine) is a Russian surname.

This surname is shared by the following people:

 Ilia Klimkin (born 1980), Russian competitive figure skater
 Pavlo Klimkin (born 1967), Ukrainian diplomat and current Minister of Foreign Affairs of Ukraine

Russian-language surnames